Raja Wodeyar I (2 June 1552 – 20 June 1617) was ninth maharaja of the Kingdom of Mysore. He was eldest son of Chamaraja Wodeyar IV, the seventh maharaja of Mysore. He ruled from 1578, after his cousin Chamaraja Wodeyar V's death, until his death in 1617.

Expelling Vijayanagara envoys 
Raja Wodeyar I furthered his father's expelling the Vijayanagara ambassadors and envoys. During Sriranga II, who himself faced riots from within his family, Raja Wodeyar removed all Vijayanagara emissaries from the Kingdom, except one in Srirangapattana. Although the kingdom declared independence from Vijayanagara and removed its representatives, Mysore Kingdom continued to recognise the empire and the emperor.

Mysore Dasara 
His procession from the Palace to the Banni tree in present-day Bannimantap came to be famous after each Mysore king, which, today, has taken the form of the world-famous Mysore Dasara.

Raja Wadiyar is credited with starting the famous Mysore Dasara in 1610 to commemorate the kingdom's independence from the Vijayanagara Empire by offering prayers to the Banni tree, about two miles away from Puragiri–the location of present-day Mysore Palace. His only surviving son, Narasaraja Wadiyar, died just a day before the commencement of Navaratri, but the king, after consulting experts, decreed that the celebration of the ceremonies was not to be interrupted even by the death of members of the royal family.

Raja Wadiyar was a devoted Vaishnavaite, and he donated the famous bejewelled crown to Lord Cheluvarayaswami Temple at Melukote; it is a feature of the Raja Mudi carnival even today. This contribution is contrary to his own lineage, for the Wadiyars regarded the temple of Karigiri Lakshmi Narasimha (at Devarayanadurga in Tumkur) as their household deity. The mere fact that all the Wadiyars end their names by Narasimharaja Wadiyar stands testimony to this. During the Emergency of 1975, this crown was confiscated from the royal family by the Government of Karnataka. Legend has it that Raja Wadiyar, having entered the garbhagruha (sanctum sanctorum) of the Cheluvarayaswami Temple on 20 June 1617, became one with the deity (aikya; passed away). An idol (bhakthi vigraha) of the king may be found inside the temple and another in the Lakshminarayanaswami Temple inside the Mysore Palace Fort.

See also
Mysore Dasara
Wodeyar dynasty
Maharaja of Mysore

1552 births
1617 deaths
Kings of Mysore
Raja I
17th-century Indian monarchs